Al Jazeera English has received prestigious awards from organisations across the globe. The network has been honoured for overall excellence in achieving its mission, in addition to praise for Al Jazeera's individual reporters and their work.

2015
New York Film Festival Gold for 101 East's The Return of the Lizard King], [http://www.aljazeera.com/programmes/101east/2014/03/dolphin-hunters-20143373330171263.html The Dolphin Hunters] and [http://www.aljazeera.com/programmes/101east/2014/02/stray-bullets-2014212111542175891.html Stray Bullets.
New York Film Festival Gold Award for Steve Chao as Best News Reporter/Correspondent
Mohamed Amin Awards Best Documentary Africa Investigates – Liberia: Living with Ebola'''
Online Media Awards Outstanding Digital Team: Palestine Remix, Al Jazeera English OnlineOnline Media Awards Best Technical Innovation Palestine RemixOnline Media Awards Best Use of Photography Portrait of an YogiOne World Media Awards Best Digital Media Award: Pirate Fishing
One World Media Awards Women's Rights in Africa Award: Witness - Casablanca Calling
Native American Journalists Association TV Best Feature Story to Shihab Rattansi & Anar Virji for Havasupai water story
Native American Journalists Association TV  Best News Story to Shihab Rattansi and Anar Virji for Tar Creek

2014
Women's Empowerment Journalism Broadcast Story Of The Year: 101 East: Nepal's Slave Girls
The George Foster Peabody Award Fault Lines: Haiti in a Time of Cholera
The George Foster Peabody Award Fault Lines: Made in Bangladesh
Webbys Award for Best Online Film in the News and Politics category: The Stream, Meme-ifying Black Interviewees
Hong Kong Human Rights Awards Al Jazeera English took home the highest number of awards this year, with four for 101 East programmes, and for Witness’s  Wukan: Flame of Democracy.
ChopShots Documentary Film Festival Best International Documentary: Wukan
Monte Carlo TV Festival Golden Nymph for Best News Documentary: Identity and Exile
Online Media Awards Simon Hooper - Best Freelance Journalist
Online Media Awards for Outstanding Digital Team Commendation:  AJE Interactives
Peabody Awards Fault Lines: Haiti in a Time of Cholera, and Made In Bangladesh.
International Emmys Fault Lines: Haiti in a Time of Cholera
World Media Summit award 101 East for ‘Exemplary News Team in Developing Countries’.
New York Festivals Gold for 101 East: It’s a Man’s World, 101 East: Murder in a God’s Name, and Everest 60th Anniversary.

2013
CINE Golden Eagle Award "What Killed Arafat" for Best Investigative Journalism
CINE Golden Eagle Award "Syria: Songs of Defiance" for Best Investigative Journalism
CINE Golden Eagle Award "So Close So Far Away" for Best Television Documentary
Gracie Award for Outstanding News Talk Show: The Stream
EMMY Award for Outstanding Investigation: "Fault Lines: Haiti In a Time of Cholera"
Peabody Award :Fault Lines: Haiti In a Time of Cholera"
Peabody Award Fault Lines: Made In Bangladesh
Webbys People Voice Award for Best News (Tablet), in the Mobile Apps category: Al Jazeera English Online Magazine
Grierson Awards|Grierson – Best Documentary on a Contemporary Theme: "Law of the Jungle"
The George Foster Peabody Award Sheikh Jarrah, My Neighbourhood
AIBD TV AWARD 2013 “The Best TV Programme on Cross-Cultural Exchange”: Camels In the Outback'''
Online Media Awards for Best Technical Innovation: Syria Defector Tracker
Online Media Awards for Outstanding Digital Team Commendation: The Stream
Online Media Awards for Best World News Website Commendation: Al Jazeera English Online
Online Media Awards for Best Crowd Sourcing Commendation : Al Jazeera English Online Kenyan election coverage
Online Media Awards for Best Twitter Feed Commendation : The Stream
New York Festivals International Television & Film Awards : Bronze Prize for 101 East: Australia's Lost Generation
New York Festivals International Television & Film Awards : Silver Prize for Lockerbie: Case Closed
Human Rights Press Awards : 101 East: Nowhere To Go
Human Rights Press Awards: 101 East: Battered and Bruised
Foreign Press Association Award: The Cure: Doctors on Everest best science story
Foreign Press Association Award: Earthrise: Urban Oil Men best environment
Asia TV Awards: 101 East, Best Current Affairs Programme

2012
Webby People's Choice Award: for News and Politics in the online film and video category, The Stream
Royal Television Society: News Channel for the Year
Royal Television Society: Most Innovative Programme, The Stream
George Polk Award for Television Documentary: Bahrain: Shouting in the Dark
The Franklin D Roosevelt Four Freedoms Awards: Freedom of Speech and Expression Medal
Alfred I DuPont Award, Best Documentary: Haiti: Six Months On
Foreign Press Association Awards (FPA): Best Environmental Story of the Year for Bee Fence: Earthrise episode 1 (series 2)
CINE Golden Eagle Award: Burma Boy for History Programming, Profession Telecast Non-fiction Category
CINE Golden Eagle Award: Bahrain: Shouting in the Dark for Investigative Programming, Profession Telecast News Division
CINE Golden Eagle Award: The Crying Forest for Investigative Programming, Professional Telecast News Division
CINE Golden Eagle Award: Witness: Dream on Hold for Informational Programming, Professional Telecast News Division
Monte Carlo TV Festival: Golden Nymph for Best News Documentary Bahrain: Shouting in the Dark
Amnesty International Media Award: Bahrain: Shouting in the Dark for International TV and Radio
Robert F. Kennedy Journalism Award: Bahrain: Shouting in the Dark for International Television
Robert F. Kennedy Journalism Award: Grand Prize, Bahrain: Shouting in the Dark
One World Media Award: Tanzania: Spell of the Albino for Children’s Rights
The George Foster Peabody Award: Al Jazeera’s Coverage of the Arab Awakening
Scripps Howard Award for Television/Cable In-Depth Reporting: Bahrain: Shouting in the Dark
International Gold Panda Award: Best Short Documentary for 101 East: Bangladesh - Too Young to Work
New York Festival: Silver Medal for 101 East: Nepal – Children for Sale

2011
Rory Peck Awards: Best Feature, Libya: Through the Fire
Foreign Press Association: Documentary of the Year, Bahrain: Shouting in the Dark
Huffington Post Ultimate Media Gamechanger Award
Freesat Awards: Best News Channel of the Year
Freesat Awards: Coverage of a Single News Event, for the channel's coverage of the Arab Spring
Arab-British Centre: Culture and Society Award
Wincott Awards: Best Television Coverage of a Business Issue, Nablus: The Business of Occupation
Columbia University Journalism Awards
Promax Awards Arabia, Gold, Best In-House Station Image
Promax Awards Arabia, Gold, Best Promo Campaign
Promax Awards Arabia, Gold, Counting the Cost
TIME magazine: Top 100 most influential people, Ayman Mohyeldin
Fast Company: Most creative thinker of the year, Wadah Khanfar

2010
Association for International Broadcasting: Clearest Coverage of a Single News Event
Freesat Awards: Best News Channel of the Year
Monte-Carlo Television Festival: Best Television News Item, Mexico in the Crossfire
Amnesty International Media Awards: International Television and Radio Award, People and Power
Concentra (Belgium): Breaking News Award, Casey Kauffman - Baby Feras

2009
International Emmy Awards nomination, Finalist in Documentary category, Shooting the Messenger
International Emmy Awards nomination, Finalist in News and Current Affairs, Russia-Georgia War" and Witness: Return to Nablus
Concentra (Belgium): Breaking News Award, Subina Shreshta : Up the Irrawaddy Delta
International Digital Emmy Awards: nominee non-fiction, 2008 US election special

2008
Foreign Press Association: News Story of the Year by a full member, Jonah Hull's "Russia-Georgia War"
Association of International Broadcasters Editors Award: Sami Al Haj, suffering endured and courage shown
Amnesty International Media Awards Best International TV Documentary: Tony Birtley's "The Lost Tribe - Secret Army of the CIA"
YouTube European Partners Awards: Community Champion Award, Al Jazeera Network
Monte-Carlo TV Festival: Golden Nymph Award - Best 24 Hour News Programme, on Gaza siege
CONCENTRA Award (2008): Breaking News, Tony Birtley’s "Inside Myanmar - The Crackdown"
Royal Television Society Journalism Awards: Young Journalist of the Year, Hamish Macdonald
Asian Television Awards: Best Current Affairs Programme, Tony Birtley’s "Inside Myanmar - The Crackdown"

2007
Asian Television Awards: Best News Report, Kylie Grey: Agent Orange
Association for International Broadcasting: Editors Award, Everywoman

2006
Association of International Broadcasters: Best Magazine or Documentary Programme, Abdallah el-Binni's "Prisoner 345"

Notes

External links 
 Awards won by Al Jazeera English

Al Jazeera